This is a list of supermarket chains in Europe.

Albania

Andorra 
 Caprabo
 Carrefour
 Condis
 E.Leclerc
 Système U

Armenia
Carrefour
Parma Supermarket
SAS Supermarket
SPAR
Yerevan City

Austria

Azerbaijan 
 Al Market
 Araz Supermarket
 Bazarstore
 Bravo Supermarket
 Fresco Supermarket
 OBA Market
 SPAR

Belarus

Belgium

Bosnia and Herzegovina

Bingo

Bulgaria

Croatia
 Konzum
 Plodine
 Lidl
 SPAR
 Kaufland
 CBA
 Metro

Cyprus
 Alphamega Hypermarkets
 Athientis
 Sklavenitis
 E&S
 Lidl
 METRO
 MAS Supermarkets
 Olympic
 Papantoniou
 SPAR

Czech Republic

Denmark

Greenland
Brugseni
Pilersuisoq
Pisiffik

Estonia

Faroe Islands
Bónus (8 stores) 
Á (12 stores) 
FK (8 stores) 
Mylnan (4 stores) 
Miklagarður (1 store) 
Samkeyp (17 stores)

Finland

France

Georgia

Abkhazia
 Azanta
 Central Supermarkets
 Premium Supermarket

Germany

Gibraltar
 Coviran
 Eroski
 Morrisons

Greece

Guernsey
 Alliance 
 Channel Islands Co-operative Society
 Iceland
 Marks & Spencer
 Waitrose
 Food Hall

Hungary

Iceland

Ireland

Isle of Man
 Co-op Food
 Shoprite
 Tesco Superstore

Italy

Jersey
 Checkers Food Stores
 Checkers Supermarket
 Checkers Xpress
 Co-op Food
 Costcutter
 Iceland
 Waitrose

Kazakhstan
 Magnum
 SMall
 METRO
 Ataba
 Ramstore
 Arzan
 Ayan
 Yuzhnyi

Kosovo
 Albi Market
 CONAD Kosova
 DEPPO Market
 ETC
 Interex
 KAM Market
 Maxi
 Meridian Express
 Next Market
 SPAR
 Viva
 Viva Fresh
 Landi star

Latvia

Liechtenstein
 Coop
 Denner
 Migros
 Spar

Lithuania

Luxembourg

Malta
Auchan (under the name of Pavi Supermarket)
Carrefour (under the name of Towers Supermarket)
Conad (under the name of Scotts Supermarket)
Lidl
SPAR

Moldova
 Linella (23)
 Green Hills (11)
 Fidesco (10)
 Fourchette (10)
 Nr. 1 (7)
 IMC Market (6)
 Metro Cash and Carry (3)
 Velmart
 Kaufland (6)

Monaco

Montenegro
HDL
Aroma
Idea
VOLI
Franca

Netherlands

North Macedonia

Northern Cyprus

Norway

Poland

Portugal

Romania

Russia

San Marino

Serbia

Slovakia

Slovenia

Spain

Sweden

Switzerland

Turkey
BIM 
Carrefour
Dia  
Metro 
Migros Türk - 1447 stores
Real 
Kipa
A101 - 9000 stores

Ukraine

United Kingdom

See also
 List of hypermarkets in Europe
 List of supermarket chains

References

Supermarket
Europe